Mallampalli is the family name of some Indians:

 Mallampalli Chandrasekhara Rao, better known as Chandra Mohan, Telugu character actor
 Mallampalli Sarabheswara Sarma, better known as Sarabhayya, an Indian poet, critic, translator and a great exponent of classical literature